The 2012 FKF Division One was the inaugural season of FKF Division One and the 49th second division season since it began in 1963. It began on 3 March with Kariobangi Sharks and Congo JMJ United in Zone A and on the same date with Kakamega Homeboyz and Kisumu Municipal in Zone B, and ended on 18 November with Nairobi Stima and MOYAS in Zone A and on the same date with Timsales and Yanga in Zone B.

Compared to the 2010 season of the then Nationwide League, the 2011 season of the FKL and KFF Nationwide League was considered to be a lot better because of major improvements in integrity of referees and playing surfaces. The major complaints of occurrences in 2010 were significantly reduced after the establishment of the NFL Oversight Committee, which closely monitored Football Kenya Limited's running of the league.

Halfway through the season (after 19 matches), Kakamega Homeboyz had been unbeaten with a record of 10-9-0 (10 wins, 9 draws, no losses). They would have become only the second club in Kenya to complete an unbeaten season, after Gor Mahia in the 1976 Kenya National Football League, but were beaten 1−0 against Nakuru AllStars on 22 July 2012, ending their unbeaten record of 23 games. On the other hand, H.B.C. Mlimani hadn't won a single match after 19 games (with a record of 0-3-16: no wins, 3 draws, 16 losses) and were en route to becoming the first club in Kenya and only the fifth in modern football to complete a domestic season without winning a match. However, through a walkover they were awarded over Yanga on 29 September 2012, their winless run of 28 games came to an end.

On 31 August, Mathare Youth disbanded and therefore pulled out of the league, after which the FKF decided to scrap all of their second round results. This meant that all teams that had played against Mathare Youth had their points revoked or given back, depending on the results of the matches, and all upcoming fixtures involving Mathare Youth were cancelled. As a result, the season would end with every other team having played 37 games instead of 38, and the total number of matches would add up to 361, 19 games less than the usual 380.

Since the league had 19 teams left, in accordance with an FKF ruling, this meant that the 16th-placed team was also to be relegated according to the rules of the league.

As of 7 October 2012, Yanga, having 10 points with 6 matches left to play, are to be relegated at the end of the season as 18 possible points from 6 possible wins would level them with Comply, who are also in the relegation zone. H.B.C. Mlimani, having 6 points with 7 matches left to play, are also to be relegated at the end of the season as 21 points from 7 possible wins would ultimately give them 27 points, one less than Comply, as of the same date.

On 4 November 2012, Bandari and Kakamega Homeboyz earned early promotions to the Kenyan Premier League. As of that date, Bandari earned 76 points from 35 matches, 8 points ahead of second-placed Mahakama, who earned 68 points from 36 matches. With 2 matches left to play for the latter, 2 wins would take them to 74 points, which would not be enough to reach the former. Kakamega Homeboyz earned 87 points from 36 matches, also 8 points ahead of the second-placed team, Nzoia United, who earned 79 points from 36 matches. 2 wins from 2 matches left to play for the latter would take them to 85 points, which would not be enough to reach the former. However, third-placed Agrochemical, with 78 points from 35 matches, can catch up to the leaders, but with a +29 goal difference, they would have to score 25 goals in and win their remaining 3 matches to reach the top of the table.

Changes from last season

After the 2011 season, the FKL Nationwide League and the KFF Nationwide League were fused, meaning that two teams were to be promoted and four relegated, and that only two from the Provincial Leagues could be promoted due to the current format of having two zones of 16 teams each.

From FKL and KFF
Promoted to Premier League
 Muhoroni Youth
 Oserian

Relegated to Provincial League
 Annex 07
 Kiambaa United
 Makarios
 Nanyuki
 Opera
 Real Kisumu
 Strathmore University

To Division One
Relegated from Premier League
 Bandari
 Congo JMJ United

Promoted from Division Two
 Coast United
 G.F.C. 105
 Green Berets
 Kakamega Homeboyz
 West Kenya Sugar (promoted as Kabrass United)
 Zoo Kericho

Teams

Stadia and locations

Zone A locations
Zone A clubs are from the Nairobi, Central, Eastern and Coast provinces.

Zone B locations
Zone B teams are from the Western, Nyanza and Rift Valley provinces.

1 Kabrass United changed their name back to West Kenya Sugar to promote their club sponsors of the same name.

Managerial changes
As of July 22, 2012.

Sparki Youth scandals

Coast United match cancellation
Sparki Youth and Coast United were punished by the FKF through a deduction of 1 point and 1 loss added to their tallies for willingly deciding not to face each other on 1 May, after it was first believed that the FKF had postponed the match.

Admiral referee assault
During their match against Admiral on 22 September, main referee Martin Wekesa was knocked on his genitalia, after which he was further assaulted and left hospitalised by a group of individuals just as he was about to show a red card to Sparki Youth striker Tobias Baraza for a second bookable offence. By the time the match was abandoned in the 88th minute, Admiral were leading 1−0 following a penalty scored by Roosevelt Blaty in the 63rd minute. Following the attacks, the FKF's National Executive Committee held a meeting on 26 September to decide on the fate of the match and punishment to be given. Admiral were awarded a win with 3 points and their 1-goal, while the following individuals in contract at Sparki Youth were punished as follows:

Mohammed Kheri had since spoken out on his innocence in the assault, saying he tried to shield the referee and even gave him first aid and called for a car to rush him to hospital. No formal appeal, however, has been submitted to the FKF so far.

League tables and results

Zone A

Zone B

Top scorers

Zone A

Last updated: 18 November 2012

Zone B

Last updated: 18 November 2012

References

2
2012
Kenyan
Kenyan